Woodville is an unincorporated community in Keene Township, Adams County, Illinois, United States. Woodville is located along Illinois Route 336 northeast of Loraine.  There are only two houses in Woodville, and the Historic Woodville Cemetery.  These are located just south of the Hancock-Adams County Line.

References

Unincorporated communities in Adams County, Illinois
Unincorporated communities in Illinois